Jujitsu competitions at the 2021 Southeast Asian Games took place at Đan Phượng District Sporting Hall in Hanoi, Vietnam from 14 to 15 May 2022.

Summary 
During the official weigh-in for the 48 kg class in jujitsu, Jessa Khan, the defending champion and 2018 Asian Games gold medalist, was disqualified for being mere 240g over the weight limit. Under the rules of the Ju-Jitsu International Federation and the SEA Games Sports Technical Handbook, she would not be allowed to compete. The National Olympic Committee of Cambodia (NOCC) lodged a formal appeal with the event’s organising committee immediately after the weigh-in, asking that she be allowed to compete in the higher weight class of 62 kg. The appeal was later denied.

Medal table

Medalists

Men

Women

References

Jujitsu